

A brake is a device which inhibits motion.

Brake may also refer to one of the following:

Transportation
 Brake (carriage),  a horse-drawn carriage used to train horses for draft work
 Railway brake
 Air brake (disambiguation)
 Air brake (aeronautics), in aeronautics, a type of flight control system used on aircraft to reduce speed
 Air brake (road vehicle), a type of brake used on large vehicles in place of hydraulic brakes, using compressed air
 Railway air brake, a type of brake operated by compressed air and used on locomotives and railroad cars
 Hydraulic brake
 Dynamic braking
 Regenerative brake
 Electromagnetic brake
 Emergency brake (train)
 Parking brake
 Counter-pressure brake
 Drum brake
 Disc brake
 Archaic past tense of the verb 'to break' (see brake)

Places
 Brake, Lower Saxony, a city in Germany
 Brake, West Virginia
 Brake, a former independent city now incorporated into Lemgo, Germany

Business
 Brake Bros Ltd, a food distributor in the UK and France

Arts

Literature and film
 Brake (film), a 2012 action film starring Stephen Dorff
 "Brake" (Anderson), Science Fiction story by Poul Anderson

Music
 Brakes (band), the UK band (known in America as BrakesBrakesBrakes)
 The Brakes, a modern rock band from Philadelphia
 "Brakes", a 2008 single from the UK band Royworld

Other
 Brake, ferns of the genus Pteris
 Brake (sheet metal bending), a tool for bending sheet metal
 Brake (surname)
 Brake (charity) a road safety charity

See also
 Braken (disambiguation)
 Break (disambiguation)